Crenicichla johanna is a species of cichlid native to South America.

References

johanna
Fish of Bolivia
Freshwater fish of Brazil
Freshwater fish of Colombia
Fish of French Guiana
Fish of Guyana
Freshwater fish of Peru
Fish of Venezuela
Fish of the Amazon basin
Fish described in 1840
Taxa named by Johann Jakob Heckel